Loxogrammoideae is a small subfamily of the fern family Polypodiaceae in the Pteridophyte Phylogeny Group classification of 2016 (PPG I), with two genera, Dictymia and Loxogramme. The subfamily was previously considered to be a separate family, Loxogrammaceae , and is also treated as the tribe Loxogrammeae within a very broadly defined family Polypodiaceae sensu lato. Molecular phylogenetic studies place the group within Polypodiaceae.

References

Epiphytes
Plant subfamilies